Pogonopoma is a genus of armored catfish native to rivers in south and southeast Brazil.

Taxonomy
Pogonopoma is one of three genera currently valid in the tribe Rhinelepini. Pogonopomoides, previously a valid genus, was placed in synonymy with Pogonopoma. This genus and Rhinelepis have a sister group relationship.

Species
There are currently three recognized species in this genus:
 Pogonopoma obscurum Quevedo & R. E. dos Reis, 2002
 Pogonopoma parahybae (Steindachner, 1877)
 Pogonopoma wertheimeri (Steindachner, 1867)

Appearance and anatomy
As loricariids, Pogonopoma species all exhibit a suckermouth and an at least slightly flattened ventral surface. However, unlike many loricariids, they have circular pupils, which differs from most members of the family that have an omega iris. Pogonopoma species are heavily armored except on their abdomen (the belly in the case of loricariids), which is relatively unplated.

P. wertheimeri is a cylindrically shaped loricariid. The cheek is covered in long, thin, non-evertible odontodes that form a dense patch.

P. parahybae  appears to be more of an intermediate between P. wertheimeri and Rhinelepis. It is fairly flattened, and also has longer pectoral and pelvic fins compared to other species of the tribe Rhinelepini. The gill openings are not as large as those in Rhinelepis. Also, this species lacks long cheek odontodes and the adipose fin.

P. obscurum, unlike P. wertheimeri, simultaneously lacks an adipose fin and cheek odontodes. Its dorsal fin base is also longer than of other members of this genus.

References

External links
 (contains excerpts from cited papers)

Hypostominae
Fish of South America
Catfish genera
Taxa named by Charles Tate Regan
Freshwater fish genera